The Elders may refer to:

 The Elders (band), a band from Missouri, US
 The Elders (album)
 The Elders (Charmed), a type of magical being in Charmed
 The Elders (organization), an international non-government organization

See also 
Elder (disambiguation)